Dominique d'Esmé (born 26 December 1945) is a French equestrian. She competed at five Olympic Games.

References

1945 births
Living people
French female equestrians
French dressage riders
Olympic equestrians of France
Equestrians at the 1976 Summer Olympics
Equestrians at the 1984 Summer Olympics
Equestrians at the 1988 Summer Olympics
Equestrians at the 1992 Summer Olympics
Equestrians at the 1996 Summer Olympics
Sportspeople from Rennes
20th-century French women